Andreas Vasili (born 19 October 1971) is a Cypriot alpine skier. He competed at the 1992 Winter Olympics and the 1998 Winter Olympics.

References

1971 births
Living people
Cypriot male alpine skiers
Olympic alpine skiers of Cyprus
Alpine skiers at the 1992 Winter Olympics
Alpine skiers at the 1998 Winter Olympics
Place of birth missing (living people)